This is a list of klezmer musicians:

Michael Alpert
József Balogh
Gérard Barreaux
Shloimke (Sam) Beckerman
Sidney Beckerman
Ofer Ben-Amots
Alan Bern
Geoff Berner
Naftule Brandwein
Stuart Brotman
Don Byron
Brian Choper
Adrienne Cooper
Abe Elenkrieg
Giora Feidman
German Goldenshteyn
David Julian Gray
Jeremiah Hescheles
Daniel Hoffman (violinist)
Elaine Hoffman-Watts
Alex Jacobowitz
Daniel Kahn
David Krakauer
Max Leibowitz
César Lerner
Margot Leverett
Frank London
Joseph Moskowitz
Hankus Netsky
Moni Ovadia
Elie Rosenblatt
Jason Rosenblatt
Pete Rushefsky
Henry Sapoznik
Abe Schwartz
Elizabeth Schwartz
Cookie Segelstein
Andy Statman
H. Steiner
Yale Strom
Alicia Svigals
Dave Tarras
Max Yankowitz

Klezmer